Annual Reports on the Progress of Chemistry was a yearly review journal published by the Royal Institute of Chemistry and after 1980 the Royal Society of Chemistry. It was established in 1904. In 1967 the journal was split into two sections, A and B, covering inorganic and organic chemistry, respectively., In 1980, a third series was started, C, covering physical chemistry. The journal was discontinued in 2013.

References

External links 
 

Chemistry journals
Royal Institute of Chemistry
Royal Society of Chemistry academic journals
Publications established in 1904
Publications disestablished in 2013
Defunct journals of the United Kingdom
English-language journals
Annual journals